Ali Qadry (Arabic: علي قادري) (born 2 February 1994) is a Irani footballer. He currently plays as a winger for Al Ahli.

External links
 

Qatari footballers
1994 births
Living people
Al Ahli SC (Doha) players
Al-Khor SC players
Aspire Academy (Qatar) players
Qatar Stars League players
Qatari Second Division players
Association football forwards